Chirilovca may refer to several places in Moldova:

 Chirilovca, a village in Halahora de Sus Commune, Briceni District
 Chirilovca, a village in Alexeevca, Floreşti
 Chirilovca, a village in Vinogradovca Commune, Taraclia District

See also 
 Chiril (disambiguation)
 Chiril River (disambiguation)
 Chirileni, a village in Ungheni District, Moldova

Surnames:
 Chirilă — search for "Chirilă"
 Chirilov — search for "Chirilov"